Anderssen's Opening is a chess opening defined by the opening move:
1. a3
Anderssen's Opening is named after unofficial World Chess Champion Adolf Anderssen, who played it three times in his 1858 match against Paul Morphy. Although Anderssen was defeated decisively in the match, the games he opened with the novelty scored 1½/3 (one win, one loss, one draw).

Anderssen's Opening is not commonly played, and is an irregular opening. The move is classified under the A00 code in the Encyclopaedia of Chess Openings. Anderssen's Opening is also the very first opening enumerated in the Oxford Companion to Chess index of 1327 openings, due to a systematic ordering which begins at White's left-hand  and proceeds to White's right-hand .

Themes
Anderssen's Opening does little in the way of development or control of the center, and is rather more of a waiting move. However some players may enjoy the psychological value of such a move, or believe it will help them against an opponent with superior knowledge of opening theory.

Among the more common Black responses to Anderssen's Opening are:
 1...d5, which makes a straightforward claim on the center,
 1...g6, which prepares to fianchetto the king's bishop to g7,
 1...e5, also playable, although White can then play 2.c4 (as occurred in the Morphy-Anderssen match), transposing to a Reversed Sicilian structure where a pawn on a3 may be useful. Another approach is 2.e4 Nf6 3.Nc3, transposing to Mengarini's Opening.

Morphy vs. Anderssen, 1858

During his tour of Europe and in the Christmastime (December 20-28) of 1858, the American master Paul Morphy engaged Adolf Anderssen in a match held at the Hôtel de Breteuil, Paris. The terms were that the first player to win seven games would be the winner of the match—draws would not count towards a win. The players took turns controlling the white pieces and the black pieces in each game, with Morphy playing as White in the first game. Although Anderssen won the first game in a laborious effort requiring 72 moves and about 7 hours of play, Morphy established dominance by winning three subsequent, shorter games.

Anderssen then employed the opening which came to bear his name in three consecutive games where he controlled the white pieces—the sixth, the eighth, and the tenth. As the match progressed his performance with the opening improved, losing the sixth, drawing the eighth, and finally securing a win in the tenth game. However this proved insufficient to prevent Morphy's win—game and match—in the eleventh. Chess writer Philip W. Sergeant documented the match in a compilation of Morphy's games.

All three games opened identically through their seventh moves. In each the players transposed to a Reversed Sicilian structure, exchanging pawns. White developed his knights, and Black activated his  before castling kingside.

Game 6

December 24. Using all of his , Black checked with an immediate mating threat, at which point White resigned. In the final position, Black was up a rook.

Game 8

December 25. The eighth game proceeded identically with the sixth a bit further than all three in common, through White's eleventh move. On his eighteenth move White played an en passant capture; according to Sergeant, Black made the capture necessary for White in order that White should avoid the problem of two black pawns against one white pawn along the queenside flank. During the middlegame, the players exchanged queens. Again equality of material was maintained throughout the middlegame, albeit that pairwise exchanges of pawns and bishops were delayed by several moves.

During the endgame, slight material inequality and the given position resulted in a draw, as White managed to halt the advance of two —and the black king which might have aided their advance. The final moves involved the white knight and the black king repeating the board position twice, threatening draw by threefold repetition. In the final position White had a knight for Black's two passed pawns.

Game 10

December 27. In the tenth game Anderssen finally converted 1. a3 to a second and final win, although the game required the most moves of any played during the match. Again, material equality was maintained during the middlegame, except that White retained a bishop for Black's knight throughout the phase. This allowed White to use his bishop pair advantageously. In the endgame White won three pawns and a knight in exchange for a rook, forcing Black to defend against White's three passed pawns, which proved unmanageable, forcing Morphy's resignation. In the final position White had a bishop and two passed pawns for Black's rook.

Later use
According to Sergeant, Anderssen later essayed the unusual opening in 1877 and 1878, using it to win games against Louis Paulsen, George Henry Mackenzie, and James Mason. 1. a3 was also used occasionally by other players of the period: Steinitz vs. Blackburne, Vienna 1873, Blackburne (unsuccessfully) vs. Lee, London 1904, and (also unsuccessfully) Mieses vs. Cohn, Ostend 1907.

A modern proponent of the move is Croatian International Master Zvonko Krečak. In March 2010 Magnus Carlsen played the opening in the blindfold game against Vassily Ivanchuk at the Amber chess tournament; Carlsen lost the game. In January 2023, Hikaru Nakamura used the opening against Carlsen in an online Chess.com Titled Tuesday tournament; Hikaru won against Carlsen.

Named variations
 1.a3 g6 2.g4 (Andersspike)
 1.a3 e5 2.h3 d5 (Creepy Crawly Formation) 
 1.a3 a5 2.b4 (Polish Gambit)

See also
 List of chess openings
 List of chess openings named after people

ReferencesBibliography'

 

Chess openings
1858 in chess